The Premium platform was General Motors's and Fiat Group's high-end automobile platform for front wheel drive and four wheel drive automobiles developed in early 2000s mainly in Sweden by Saab engineers.

The architecture debuted in production form with the Alfa Romeo Brera, although it was used earlier for the Opel Insignia concept in 2003 and Alfa Romeo Visconti (concept car) in 2004.  After the dissolution of the GM/Fiat partnership, both companies retained the rights to continue developing Premium-derived models, though no GM versions were produced as the platform was considered too expensive for Opel cars and a great cost for a small premium manufacturer as Saab.

Saab stopped the development of the platform and therefore of its Premium automobile in late 2002; the Saab models (the 9X sports car and the replacement for the 9-5 sedan) would have used an entirely different suspension than the Alfa Romeo vehicles, which would have proved too expensive. Although the platform debuted in 2003 with the Opel Insignia concept car, this vehicle was not produced. A planned Buick model was also dropped. In the end, only the Alfa Romeo models moved forward to production and Saab's development and introduction of new 9-5 was seriously delayed. Some of the GM models originally set to use the Premium platform eventually were produced using the GM Epsilon II platform.

References 

P
P
General Motors platforms